Matongo is an administrative ward in the Mkalama District of the Singida Region of Tanzania. In 2016 the Tanzania National Bureau of Statistics report there were 6,955 people in the ward, from 6,338 in 2012.

Villages 
The ward has 18 villages.

 Matongo A
 Matongo B
 Kirumi
 Hindamili
 Mpondelo
 Isene Isene
 Kinyamapupu
 Igwilambao
 Idebe
 Kinyamkunde
 Manung'una Munung’una
 Mwamakiki
 Mabiha
 Mwamidu
 Mazangili Mazangili
 Tandusi
 Munguli
 Mkenka

References

Wards of Singida Region